Viktor Kunz (born 21 March 1968) is a Swiss former cyclist. He competed in the individual pursuit at the 1992 Summer Olympics.

References

External links
 

1968 births
Living people
Swiss male cyclists
Olympic cyclists of Switzerland
Cyclists at the 1992 Summer Olympics
Place of birth missing (living people)